The Vychegda is a river in the European part of Russia, tributary to the Northern Dvina. It flows roughly in western direction, through Komi Republic and Arkhangelsk Oblast. The largest city along the Vychegda is Syktyvkar, the capital of Komi Republic. The Viled, the Yarenga, and the Vym are among its main tributaries. The Vychegda flows into the Northern Dvina in Kotlas (Arkhangelsk Oblast).

The river basin of the Vychegda comprises vast areas in Arkhangelsk Oblast and in the Komi Republic, as well as less extended areas in Kirov Oblast and Perm Krai.

About  of the Vychegda is navigable. In 1822 the Vychegda was connected to the river Kama, a tributary of the river Volga, by the Northern Catherine Canal, which, however, has been disused since 1838. In summer there is regular passenger navigation connecting Kotlas and Soyga (located approximately halfway between Solvychegodsk and Yarensk).

History 
The area was originally populated by Ugric peoples and then colonized by the Novgorod Republic. Solvychegodsk was founded in the 14th century, Yarensk has been known since 1374. The area was attractive in the first instance because of the fur trading. From the Northern Dvina, the merchants went to the Vychegda, and further they could get directly to the river basin of the Pechora via either the Cherya and the Izhma, or via the Mylva.

Name 
The Russian name – Vychegda – is believed to come from an ancient Ob-Ugric name with the meaning "meadow river" (reconstructed as *vič-oxt, compare Mansi wānsi "grass" and āxt "stream"). Komi Ežva is a calque from this name: eža "meadow" and va "water, river".

References

External links

Rivers of Arkhangelsk Oblast
Rivers of the Komi Republic